St. Joseph's College School (St. Joseph's College, SJCS, or St. Joe's, more colloquially known as St. Joe's Wellesley), formerly known as St. Joseph's Academy for Young Ladies is a girls' Catholic high school in downtown Toronto, Ontario, Canada operated by the Toronto Catholic District School Board, formerly the Metropolitan Separate School Board in which the school is a member since 1987. Founded in 1854 by the Sisters of St. Joseph, it turned 150 years old in the school year 2004-2005 and turned 160 years old in the school year 2014–2015. In the year 2010–2011, the Fraser Institute ranked St. Joseph's College amongst the top 5% of Ontario schools.

History and tradition 
St. Joseph's College School was founded by the Sisters of St. Joseph of Toronto in 1854, three years after the first nuns from the order came to the city. The roots of the Congregation began in LePuy, France, when the Sisters of St. Joseph was established in 1648 by a French Jesuit named Jean Paul Médaille.

Originally called “St. Joseph’s Academy for Young Ladies,” the name was changed to “St. Joseph’s College School, a Boarding and Day School for the Higher and Primary Education of Young Ladies and Little Girls” when the school moved to Bay and St. Alban's Street in 1863. In 1927, the school was renamed “St. Joseph’s College School” when it was moved to a building separate from the convent.

St. Joseph's College has a history of promoting girls’ and women's education.  In 1911, the school requested to be affiliated with the University of Toronto—a request the then-president of the university, Sir Robert Falconer, granted.  St. Joseph's was officially tied to St. Michael's College, the Roman Catholic college of the University of Toronto, in 1912.  This resulted in women being able to take courses at St. Michael's College for the first time.  In 1928, the Academy was renamed St. Joseph's College School.

When the Ontario government purchased the convent property to construct four office towers, the Sisters of St. Joseph relocated the College School across the street at its present location.  Students helped with the move, carrying furniture across Wellesley Street. St. Joseph's College School on 74 Wellesley Street West opened on September 3, 1961. In 1967, it entered an agreement with the Metropolitan Separate School Board (now The Toronto Catholic District School Board) where Grades 9 and 10 were placed into the publicly funded system, while later grades continued to pay tuition.

The school also operated the commercial school on Sherbourne Street for secretarial skills. This school became co-educational and renamed to Thomas Merton Catholic Secondary School in 1985.

In 1984, the Ontario government expanded funding in Grades 11–13, the College School became entirely publicly funded in 1987 as it was ceased as a private school, at which time the Sisters leased the school to the Metropolitan Separate School Board.  The last Sister of St. Joseph to serve as principal retired in June 1996 (Sister Conrad Lauber). The Toronto Catholic District School Board has owned the College School property since December 2007.

On May 31, 2012, the head janitor of SJCS, Vincent Perna, was charged with attempted murder as police alleged Perna went to the staff room and tried to help kitchen staff light a stove after a gas line had been severed in the basement of the school.

Education 
St. Joseph's College School offers a full-time Extended French program, a variety of Advanced Placement and enriched courses, and a wide range of classes in the sciences and the humanities.  Additionally, the Arts Department offers drama, visual arts, music, and new media arts programming. Drama students, for example, have taken part in the Sears Ontario Drama Festival.  St. Joseph's regularly scores within the top 10% of schools on the Education Quality and Accountability Office's standardised tests.

The school also has a Gifted education program and an Enriched program.  Through these, students are able to take part in a number of activities, including Encounters With Canada, the University of Toronto Mentorship Program, model United Nations conferences, the Queen's University Enrichment Studies Unit, the University of Toronto Gifted Conference, Canadian Open Mathematics Challenge, and the University of Waterloo's various mathematics competitions.

Chaplaincy 

The Chaplaincy program at St. Joseph's College School provides all staff and students experiences of prayer, the sacraments, social action and Catholic leadership.  The school chaplaincy team leader and the student chaplaincy team organize the student retreat program, plan all aspects of school liturgies, contribute to the annual Remembrance Day assembly, and facilitate many other school projects.

Uniform 

Students at St. Joseph's wear a uniform, which includes a Dress Gordon plaid kilt, a white blouse with the school insignia, and navy cardigans, full-zip sweaters and sweater vests embroidered with the school crest.

Notable alumnae 
Nhooph Al-Areebi - professional wrestler / WWE developmental Diva (as Jasmin Areebi / Aliyah)

See also
List of high schools in Ontario

References

External links

St. Joseph's College School

Toronto Catholic District School Board
High schools in Toronto
Catholic secondary schools in Ontario
Educational institutions established in 1864
1864 establishments in Canada